Amercanex is a Denver, Colorado-based company founded in 2014 that has created an electronic commodities exchange for cannabis. The company will buy and sell cannabis futures, depending on standardization of grades and even nomenclature around strains. The company unsuccessfully bid to operate Puerto Rico's seed-to-sale medical cannabis tracking system in 2016. The CEO, Steve Janjic, was formerly involved in the foreign exchange market.

References

External links

Financial services companies established in 2014
2014 establishments in Colorado
American companies established in 2014
Cannabis companies of the United States
Commodity exchanges in the United States
Companies based in Denver